Akoko North-West is a local government area in Ondo State, Nigeria. Its headquarters is in the town of Okeagbe.

It has an area of 512 km2 and a population of 213,792 at the 2006 census.

The postal code of the area is 342.

Town and villages
Towns in the local government area include Iye, Ese, Okeagbe, Ikaram, Arigidi, Erusu, Ibaram, Iyani, Ase, Irun, Ogbagi, Ajowa, Afin, Oyin, Eriti, Igasi.

Iye Akoko is the one of the villages in Akoko North West Local Government Area of Ondo State. Surrounded with some rocky hills. Iye Akoko comprises six quarters and six recognized high chiefs. It is located 25 km from Arigidi Akoko, with a population of ten thousand people as of the last census. There major works are teaching and farming. The Royal title of the community is called "Oniye of Iye Akoko".

Traditional rulers
Traditionally, the towns and villages have monarchs who rule over local municipalities. They are the Elese of Ese, the Ajana of Afa-Okeagbe, the Oluyani of Iyani, Akala of Ikaram, Zaki of Arigidi,Olu Ugbe of Ugbe Akoko, Osula of Erusu, Owa of Ogbagi, Olubaram of Ibaram, Oniye of Iye, Oludotun of Iludotun Ajowa, Olugedegede of Gedegede and Onirun of Irun, Alase of Ase, Oloyin of Oyin, Owage of Oge-Okeagbe, Oludo of Ido-Okeagbe, Ewi of Aje-Okeagbe, Olojo of Ojo Ajowa, Elesuku of Esuku Ajowa, Oludaja of Daja Ajowa, Olora of Ora Ajowa, Elefifa of Efifa Ajowa,  Oluro of Uro Ajowa, Oloje of Igasi-Akoko, Alafin of Afin-Akoko.

Languages
Languages of Akoko North–West LGA:

Yoruba language
Akoko language
Akpes language (Àbèsàbèsì)
Ayere-Ahan languages
Ahan language
Ayere language

Notable people
 Prince Adetokunbo Kayode (SAN), Former Minister of Defense, Federal Republic of Nigeria
 T. B. Joshua, televangelist
 Chief Dr. J. O Sanusi, formal Central Bank of Nigeria governor
 Engineer  Awe Gboyega, the CEO of Damatol group of companies
 The  Owa of Ogbagi Akoko, HRM Oba Adetona Odagbaragaja
 Major General Henry Ayoola (RTD)

References

External links
 Akoko North-West at Ondo State Government

Local Government Areas in Ondo State